Grudziński (feminine: Grudzińska, plural: Grudzińscy) is a Polish surname. It may refer to:

 Gustaw Herling-Grudziński (1919–2000), Polish writer
 Jan Grudziński (1907–1940), Polish submarine commander
Piotr Grudziński (1975–2016), Polish guitarist
 Zygmunt Grudziński (1560–1618), voivode of Rawa
 Zygmunt Grudziński (1568–1653), voivode of Innowrocław and Kalisz
 Zygmunt Grudziński (radiologist) (1870–1929), Polish radiologist

See also
 

Polish-language surnames